The following is a list of flags that are and used to be used in the United Mexican States and its predecessor states.

National flag

Presidential flags

Historical

State flags

Municipality flags

Military flags

Annexation

Political flags

Native American flags

Other flags

See also
 Coat of arms of Mexico
 Himno Nacional Mexicano
 Flags of North America

References

Mexico
 
Flags